Đuraš Vrančić was a Serbian nobleman who served King Stefan Milutin (r. 1282–1321) with the court title of stavilac. He is the oldest known stavilac. The title of stavilac ranked as the last in the hierarchy of the Serbian court, behind čelnik, kaznac, tepčija and vojvoda, the supreme title. He was the father of Ilija, and grandfather of Đuraš Ilijić. He was a progenitor of the Đurašević (Crnojević).

References

Sources

13th-century Serbian nobility
14th-century Serbian nobility
People of the Kingdom of Serbia (medieval)
Crnojević noble family
Year of birth unknown
Year of death unknown